Mohammed Al-Aqel (born 7 February 2000) is a Saudi Arabian professional footballer who plays as a winger for Al-Riyadh.

Club career
Al-Aqel started his career at Al-Lewaa before moving to Al-Tai in 2018. He made his first-team debut during the 2019–20 season. He scored his first goal for the club on 7 January 2020 in the 2–1 win against Al-Taqadom. He made 21 appearances and scored twice in his first season at the club. In his second season, Al-Aqel made 15 appearances and scored once as Al-Tai earned promotion to the Pro League for the first time since 2008. He made his Pro League debut on 16 September in the 0–0 draw against Al-Batin.

On 20 July 2022, Al-Aqel joined First Division side Al-Riyadh.

References

External links
 

2000 births
Living people
Association football wingers
Saudi Arabian footballers
Saudi Arabia youth international footballers
Al-Lewaa Club players
Al-Tai FC players
Al-Riyadh SC players
Saudi First Division League players
Saudi Professional League players